Michael R. Brown is an American politician and doctor who served as the 26th mayor of Grand Forks, North Dakota from 2000 to 2020.

Early life and education
Brown was born in Albuquerque, New Mexico, the son of a United States Air Force jet mechanic. He spent his childhood in Japan and England before returning to New Mexico. Brown earned a Bachelor of Science and Master of Arts degree from Baylor University before joining the United States Air Force, where he served in the intercontinental ballistic missile (ICBM) community. He served as a Deputy ICBM Launch Control Officer, ICBM Launch Control Officer Commander and ICBM Launch Control Officer Instructor. He was stationed in Grand Forks, and earned a Doctor of Medicine from the University of North Dakota School of Medicine and Health Sciences. He became a lieutenant colonel.

Career
Brown is an obstetrician at Altru Health System in Grand Forks.

He was first elected mayor in 2000 and reelected in 2004, 2008, 2012, and 2016.

In 2007, Brown was appointed to the advisory board of the Federal Emergency Management Agency. After the June 9, 2020, election, Brown was succeeded as mayor by Kazakhstani-American National Hockey League player Brandon Bochenski.

References

External links
Grand Forks "Office of the Mayor" official website
FEMA Announces Membership Of National Advisory Council

Year of birth missing (living people)
Living people
Mayors of Grand Forks, North Dakota
People from New Mexico
Politicians from Albuquerque, New Mexico
United States Air Force officers
Baylor University alumni
University of North Dakota alumni